Yalquz Aghaj Rural District is in Koshksaray District of Marand County, East Azerbaijan province, Iran. Its constituent villages were a part of Koshksaray Rural District of the Central District until 2019, when the rural district was elevated to the status of a district and divided into two new rural districts. The center of the rural district is the village of Yalquz Aghaj, with 3,537 people in 1,064 households in 2016.

References 

Marand County

Rural Districts of East Azerbaijan Province

Populated places in East Azerbaijan Province

Populated places in Marand County

fa:دهستان یالقوزآغاج